Grotella melanocrypta is a moth in the genus Grotella, of the family Noctuidae. The species was first described by Harrison Gray Dyar Jr. in 1912. This moth species is found in North America, including Puebla, Mexico, its type location.

References

Grotella
Moths described in 1912